Newton John Stabb, OBE (15 December 1868 – 1 December 1931) was the chief manager of the Hongkong and Shanghai Banking Corporation between 1910–1920.

Early Life
He was born in 1868, the son of Nicolas Sparks Stabb. He studied at Newton College, Devon and arrived in the Far East in March 1891.

Career
He joined the Singapore branch of the Hongkong and Shanghai Banking Corporation as a junior and transfer to Shanghai in 1895 and to Hong Kong in 1903. In 1906, he was appointed agent at Saigon and in 1909 he returned to London as sub-manager of the home office. He returned to Hong Kong in 1910 and was appointed acting chief manager and confirmed in 1910 until he returned to London and became the manager in the London branch in 1920.

During his years in Hong Kong, he was appointed to the Executive Council of Hong Kong in 1919. He was knighted in 1921 and awarded the Order of the British Empire. In 1927, he received the Order of the Sacred Treasure (Second Class) from the Japanese Emperor.

Personal life

He married Ethel Mary Townsend, daughter of A. M. Townsend, former manager of the London branch and director of the London Board of the Hongkong and Shanghai Banking Corporation (HSBC). Stabb had two sons and three daughters. One  son, Nicolas John Stabb, a pilot for the Royal Air Force Volunteer Reserve, was killed in 1942 during the Second World War.

He died at the age of 63 in London on 1 December 1931 and was buried in Brookwood Cemetery in Woking.

References

1868 births
1931 deaths
Officers of the Order of the British Empire
HSBC people
Members of the Executive Council of Hong Kong
Hong Kong bankers
English bankers
British expatriates in Hong Kong
Burials at Brookwood Cemetery